Gina Long  (born 4 April 1962 in Ipswich, Suffolk, England) is a philanthropist, entrepreneur, journalist, radio presenter and global charity campaigner. She was awarded an MBE for services to the charity sector in December 2015. She was made a Honorary Fellow of the University of Suffolk in October 2018.

Career
After a successful media and communications career in the United Kingdom, Long went to America and became a global entrepreneur as the first non-US citizen to be awarded the licensees for the National Football League, Major League Baseball and National Basketball Association, along with 70 collegiate licenses. With her company Unique Event Products, she created and sold what became some of the most successful sporting novelty products. Upon returning to England, Long recognised a gap in the UK advertising market - and identified that roundabouts, placed strategically throughout the UK, were the perfect platform for promoting to motorists. She founded Marketing Force, now the UK's market leader in roundabout sponsorship. She then became the Head of Communications at Hutchison Whampoa Ltd, working with the Executive Team, and leading Marketing and Communications for Hutchison Westports and their ports globally, progressing to Head of Communications at BT Exact, working with the CEO and Executive Board. Long then created a mobile phone content business called Celebrity Messages, which became a global enterprise. Alongside her career, Long has devoted over 40 years as a voluntary charity campaigner and fundraiser. She regularly writes columns and articles, interviewing and championing successful businesses, individuals, celebrities and entrepreneurs as well as highlighting national and regional charity fundraising achievements and events.

Charity work

Long was appointed MBE for services to the charity sector in December 2015. Long has raised almost £7 million for charity and started her own charitable foundation in December 2015 to support East Anglian families living with cancer or a disability. The GeeWizz Charitable Trust was set up to create a platform to purchase much-needed equipment for children in Suffolk and Norfolk helping two specific groups – children and young adults with disabilities and those who are affected by cancer, either directly or indirectly, or those carrying out research into the disease, especially sarcoma and breast cancer.  The GeeWizz slogan is #transparentgiving, based on the principles of transparent and accountable fundraising to ensure every donor and fundraiser knows exactly where their money is spent and how it changes many lives of those supported.

In April 2010, Long launched the very first Sir Bobby's Online Auction, a global fundraiser held in memory of her dear friend and former England manager Sir Bobby Robson. The two-week online auction, held annually until 2015, featured luxury ‘money-can’t-buy’ items from the world of sport, celebrity and lifestyle raising hundreds of thousands of pounds for the Sir Bobby Robson Foundation, Breakthrough Breast Cancer and other charities. The likes of Wayne Rooney, Sir Alex Ferguson and Jose Mourinho have all supported the global fundraiser in the past.

Long then launched the Ultimate Charity Auction, a global online auction offering unique money-can't-buy prizes supported by football clubs around the world as well as FIFA, UEFA and other global industry leaders. Since its inception, the auction - which works in partnership with the League Managers Association and global, national and regional media - has raised more than £1 million for national and local charities, along with supporting specific mental health programmes, funding crucial cancer research and funding life-changing equipment for children living with life-threatening conditions.

She was a founder member of the Suffolk Breakthrough Breast Cancer group and in August 2015, Long and close friends celebrated raising £1 million for the charity. Long took the lead in implementing an East Anglian-based special events fundraising committee of the Prince's Trust, chairing it for two of her 10 years and helping to raise more than £480,000, and later became chair of the special events committee of East Anglia's Children's Hospice, covering Suffolk, Norfolk, Cambridgeshire and North Essex.

Long continues to devotes her life to running the GeeWizz charity - alongside advising many other charities and mentoring students and entrepreneurs throughout the UK.

In 2020, Long created and organised the Ed Sheeran Made in Suffolk Legacy Auction. A total of £506,000 was raised to fund two legacy projects - the redevelopment of a much-need playground at the Thomas Wolsey Ormiston Academy in Ipswich and the introduction of a specialist nursing team - including learning disability and palliative care nurses and physiotherapists - at the Zest service, run by St Elizabeth Hospice. Thanks to the auction, these crucial projects can now be a reality. The auction saw Gina and her small team work closely with John and Imogen Sheeran, parents to Ed Sheeran, the global singer, songwriter, musician and record producer, who donated several prizes, along with many other global superstars, artists and organisations.

Personal life
Gina Long is married to Andrew with two children and five step-children. The couple annually host the Classic Sports Cars by the Lake, along with a committee, raising substantial funds and awareness for St Nicholas Hospice Care. The community event includes over 800 vintage cars, attracting over 5,000 people and has become a renowned attraction every September, raising over £350,000 to date. In April 2017, Long was joined by close friend Lisa Lumley in completing the London Marathon to raise money and awareness for Sarcoma UK. She successfully completed the challenge, raising over £18,000 despite joking that she could barely run a minute when she started training.  Long and Lumley were supporting the national cancer charity after her daughter, then aged just 23, was diagnosed with a Myxoid Liposarcoma in September 2013. Long has pledged to always fundraise for Sarcoma UK alongside her work with GeeWizz and other national, regional and local charities - in a mentoring and campaigning capacity - plus working with many families throughout the UK.

References

1962 births
21st-century British journalists
British radio journalists
British women radio presenters
English radio presenters
English women journalists
Living people